The Zmaj R-1 was a twin-engined prototype bomber produced by Zmaj aircraft of the former Yugoslavia, designed in the 1930s. The aircraft remained a prototype due to a number of difficulties in testing.

Design and development

During 1936 at the Zmaj factory, Dušan Stankov, then technical manager, initiated the design and construction of a reconnaissance-bomber. After tests in the wind tunnel at Warsaw and acceptance by the Yugoslavian Air Force, the project was designated Zmaj R-1. The team of designers joining Eng. Djordje Ducić and a few young engineers who worked on the design completed the prototype before the beginning of a large aerospace workers strike in April 1940, with final assembly at the military part of the airport in Zemun.

The first flight was on 24 April 1940, piloted by reserve Lieutenant Đura E. Đaković, a transport pilot with Aeroput. The initial testing justified all expectations in terms of aerodynamic characteristics and performance, unfortunately on the third flight the pilot was unable to lower the landing gear and had to land with the undercarriage extended, damaging the propellers and engines. Replacement parts for the propeller and landing gear were imported from Germany and France delaying repairs considerably. The aircraft was rebuilt so that testing could be resumed at the end of March 1941, but in early April the bombing of Zemun airport damaged the prototype Zmaj R-1 again. In late June 1941 the Germans scrapped the aircraft.

The reconnaissance variant carried cameras, extra fuel tanks and three crew members in lieu of guns and bombs.

Operational history
Due to the cessation of flight testing the plans for the Yugoslav Royal Air Force reconnaissance and bomber units to be solely equipped with the Zmaj R-1 came to naught.

Operators

Royal Yugoslav Air Force 1 aircraft

Specifications

See also

Notes

References

 Војна енциклопедија, Београд, 1975., страна 348.
 О. Петровић., Војни аероплани Краљевине СХС/Југославије (Део II: 1931–1941.), Лет (Flight)No.3/2004. Београд, 2004.

External links
 http://vazduhoplovnetradicijesrbije.rs/index.php/istorija/246-zmaj-r-1 
 www.aeroflight.co.uk/waf/yugo/af2/types/ikarus.htm
 www.dragan.freeservers.com
 http://www.letletlet-warplanes.com/2008/06/02/zmaj-r-1/ 
 http://www.airwar.ru/enc/bww2/r1.html 

Zmaj aircraft
1940s Yugoslav bomber aircraft
Mid-wing aircraft
Aircraft first flown in 1940
Twin piston-engined tractor aircraft